La liceale nella classe dei ripetenti (literally The high school girl in the class of repeaters) is a 1978 commedia sexy all'italiana directed by Mariano Laurenti. It is the second chapter in the "Liceale" film-series and was followed by La liceale seduce i professori.  Alvaro Vitali, who played a student in the first film, plays a teacher in this one.

Plot
Angela is studying in the same school where his father taught. She is a beautiful girl and despite her boyfriend Tonino is not exactly an Adonis, she insists to be faithful to him. But when discovers that she had been repeatedly betrayed, she decides to take revenge allowing himself to Carlo, in love with her for a lifetime.

Cast 
 Gloria Guida: Angela Cantalupo
 Lino Banfi: Zenobio Cantalupo
 Gianfranco D'Angelo: Prof. Pinzarrone
 Alvaro Vitali: Prof. Modesti
 Rodolfo Bigotti: Carlo
 Carlo Sposito: The principal
 Ria De Simone: Tecla, the Bolognese

Related films 
La liceale (1975)   

La liceale seduce i professori (1979)   
La liceale, il diavolo e l'acquasanta (1979), anthology film 
La liceale al mare con l'amica di papà (1980), without Gloria Guida

References

External links
 

1978 films
Commedia sexy all'italiana
Italian high school films
Liceale films
Films directed by Mariano Laurenti
1970s sex comedy films
Films scored by Gianni Ferrio
1978 comedy films
1970s Italian films